Dacrymyces chrysospermus is a species of jelly fungus in the family Dacrymycetaceae. In the UK it has the recommended English name of orange jelly spot; in North America it is known as orange jelly or orange witch's butter. The species is saprotrophic and grows on dead coniferous wood. Basidiocarps are gelatinous, bright orange, and extremely variable in shape, but typically stoutly stipitate with a spoon- or cup-shaped, spore-bearing head. Dacrymyces chrysospermus was originally described from New England, but is said to have a worldwide distribution. Microscopically it is distinguished from most other species of Dacrymyces by its comparatively large (18–23 by 6.5–8 µm), 7-septate basidiospores.

References

Dacrymycetes
Fungi of North America
Fungi of Europe
Fungi described in 1873
Taxa named by Miles Joseph Berkeley
Taxa named by Moses Ashley Curtis